Itzehoe-Land is an Amt ("collective municipality") in the district of Steinburg, in Schleswig-Holstein, Germany. It is situated around Itzehoe, which is the seat of the Amt, but not part of it.

The Amt Itzehoe-Land consists of the following municipalities:

Ämter in Schleswig-Holstein